Rivington services is a motorway service area in Anderton, Lancashire, England. The service station is situated between Junctions 6 and 8 of the M61 (there is no Junction 7).

History

Construction
Built in 1971, under the original name of Anderton Services, they were later renamed Rivington Services, and then Bolton West Services.

The site was opened by Elizabeth II on the same day that the Queen opened the Pennine section of the M62, Thursday 14 October 1971. The Queen had left London from Euston railway station to travel to Huddersfield railway station. After the opening, the Queen caught the British Royal Train at Leyland railway station. The Queen spent 45 minutes at the services (like many truck drivers do today), and unveiled a plaque.

Both sides had petrol, but only the westbound side had catering, when it opened.

Name change
In June 2011, they reverted to the name Rivington Services after being acquired by Euro Garages from First. 
It has changed hands a number of times, having been owned by the Kenning Motor Group, Rank, Pavilion, Granada, and BP, who leased it to First Motorway Services. 

In the summer of 2009, the service area was acquired by Blackburn based Euro Garages. After years of criticism, during which it was dubbed the worst service station in the country, plans were made to demolish the existing buildings and replace them with a smaller main building, petrol station and other facilities and amenities.

See also
 List of motorway service areas in the United Kingdom

References

External links
Euro Garages
Motorway services online

1971 establishments in England
M61 motorway service stations
Buildings and structures in the Borough of Chorley
Transport in Lancashire